John Melvin Hill (February 15, 1915 – April 11, 1996) was an ice hockey right winger who was perhaps best known for his record three overtime goals in a playoff series in the 1939 playoffs which earned him the moniker, "Sudden Death". He was born in Argyle, Manitoba.

Playing career
Hill started playing for the Boston Bruins of the National Hockey League in 1937–38, and played only six games, scoring two goals. The next season, he scored ten goals and had twenty points, but it was in the playoffs that year that he rose into prominence. In the semi-finals that year against the New York Rangers, he scored three sudden-death overtime goals to help the Bruins knock off the Rangers and go on to win the Stanley Cup. All in all, he had six goals and nine points in twelve games in the playoffs that year.

Hill was traded to the Brooklyn Americans for cash on June 27, 1941. He only played one season in Brooklyn as the team folded, but he scored 37 points in 47 games there. After the season his rights were transferred to the Toronto Maple Leafs in the dispersal draft. The 1942–43 proved to be Hill's best in the NHL, as he scored seventeen goals and forty-four points in forty-nine games. He would go on to produce for the Leafs for three more seasons, before moving down to the Pittsburgh Hornets of the American Hockey League.

Hill finished his NHL career with 89 goals and 198 points in 324 games, and managed to win three Stanley Cups Boston Bruins 1939, 1941, Toronto 1945.

Hill was also an accomplished soccer player who played for Saskatoon Legion in the late 1930s.  He was selected for the Saskatchewan all star teams that played against the touring Islington Corinthians from England in 1938 and the touring Scottish F.A. team in 1939.  Hill played on the left wing.

After hockey
After his hockey career he owned and operated a Pepsi-Cola and Canada Dry bottling plant in Regina, Saskatchewan. Hill died at the age of 82 in 1996.

Awards and achievements
Stanley Cup Championships (1939, 1941 & 1945)
"Honoured Member" of the Manitoba Hockey Hall of Fame

Career statistics

References

External links

1914 births
1996 deaths
Boston Bruins players
Brooklyn Americans players
Canadian ice hockey right wingers
Hershey Bears players
Ice hockey people from Manitoba
Pittsburgh Hornets players
Toronto Maple Leafs players
Springfield Indians players
Stanley Cup champions